Srikanta Mahata   is an Indian politician member of All India Trinamool Congress.  He is an MLA, elected from the  Salboni constituency in the 2011 West Bengal Legislative Assembly election. In 2016 and 2021 assembly election he was re-elected from the same constituency.

References 

Trinamool Congress politicians from West Bengal
People from Paschim Medinipur district
West Bengal MLAs 2021–2026
Living people

Year of birth missing (living people)